Greenburgh is a town in western Westchester County, New York. The population was 95,397 at the time of the 2020 census.

History
Greenburgh developed along the Hudson River, long the main transportation route. It was settled by northern Europeans in its early years, primarily of Dutch and English descent. Residents were active during the American Revolutionary War.

The Romer-Van Tassel House served as the first town hall, from 1793 into the early 19th century. It was added to the National Register of Historic Places in 1994. Other locations on the National Register are the Church of St. Joseph of Arimathea and Odell House. The Spanish American War Monument to the 71st Infantry Regiment in Mount Hope Cemetery was added to the National Register of Historic Places in 2011.

Geography
Greenburgh is bordered by the city of Yonkers on the south, the town of Mount Pleasant to the north, and to the east by the city of White Plains and the town of Scarsdale. The western boundary is the Hudson River. The Tappan Zee Bridge connects Tarrytown in Greenburgh with South Nyack in Orangetown, New York.

Demographics

As of the 2000 census, there were 86,764 people, 33,043 households, and 23,097 families residing in the town. The population density was 2,842.7 people per square mile (1,097.6/km2). There were 34,084 housing units at an average density of 1,116.7 per square mile (431.2/km2). The racial makeup of the town was 72.41% White, 13.07% African American, 0.17% Native American, 8.77% Asian, 0.05% Pacific Islander, 2.94% from other races, and 2.59% from two or more races. Hispanic or Latino of any race were 9.02% of the population.

There were 33,043 households, out of which 32.4% had children under the age of 18 living with them, 57.3% were married couples living together, 9.8% had a female householder with no husband present, and 30.1% were non-families. 25.5% of all households were made up of individuals, and 9.1% had someone living alone who was 65 years of age or older. The average household size was 2.57 and the average family size was 3.10.

In the town, the population was spread out, with 23.7% under the age of 18, 5.9% from 18 to 24, 29.7% from 25 to 44, 26.2% from 45 to 64, and 14.6% who were 65 years of age or older. The median age was 40 years. For every 100 females, there were 90.3 males. For every 100 females age 18 and over, there were 84.5 males.

According to a 2007 estimate, the median income for a household in the town was $100,656, and the median income for a family was $118,360. Males had a median income of $64,186 versus $46,658 for females. The per capita income for the town was $43,778. About 2.0% of families and 3.9% of the population were below the poverty line, including 3.4% of those under age 18 and 4.8% of those age 65 or over.

By 1991, 5% of the community's population was of Asian origins.

Communities and locations in the Town of Greenburgh 
Roughly half of Greenburgh's population reside within the town's six incorporated villages. The rest live in the unincorporated area of the town of Greenburgh, outside any villages.

Villages
Greenburgh contains six villages:
Ardsley
Dobbs Ferry
Elmsford
Hastings-on-Hudson
Irvington
Tarrytown

Unincorporated area  
The unincorporated area of Greenburgh consists of the formerly rural areas of the town outside the villages. While hamlets are not recognized as municipal entities in New York State, most properties in unincorporated Greenburgh are classified within one of the town's three federally recognized zones, each known as a census-designated place. These generally correspond to a fire district.

Fairview
Greenville
Hartsdale

Other unincorporated areas in Greenburgh outside of the three main CDPs include the neighborhoods of:

East Irvington
North Elmsford
South Ardsley

Transportation
Interstate 87 (the New York State Thruway), the Cross Westchester Expressway, the Saw Mill River Parkway, the Bronx River Parkway, and the Sprain Brook Parkway all pass through the town. US routes include U.S. Route 9. State routes that traverse the town are Route 9A, Route 100 (as well as A, B and C) and Route 119.

The Metro-North Railroad's Hudson Line passes through the west of the town with stations at Hastings-on-Hudson, Dobbs Ferry, Ardsley-on-Hudson, Irvington and Tarrytown, and its Harlem Line passes through the east of the town with a station at Hartsdale.

Westchester County's Bee-Line Bus System also serves the town, and the HudsonLink Bus Service provides connections across the Governor Mario M. Cuomo Bridge to Rockland County.

Economy

The Westchester Library System headquarters are in the town, in Elmsford.
As of 2014, The income per capita in Greenburgh is $55,049. The median household income is $100,282.

Notable people

 Freddie Blassie, professional wrestler
 Cab Calloway, jazz musician
 Gordon Parks, photographer
 Moms Mabley, comedian 
 Donovan Mitchell, NBA player
 Dana Reeve, actress and wife of Christopher Reeve
 Biff Henderson, television personality
 Adam Clayton Powell Jr., Baptist pastor and politician
 Adam Clayton Powell III, journalist, academic, and media executive
 Hazel Scott, jazz vocalist
 Roy Campanella, professional baseball player

Notes

It consists primarily of unincorporated parts of the town of Greenburgh, but is also commonly considered to include adjoining parts of the villages of Irvington and Tarrytown which branch off from East Sunnyside Lane and Mountain Road. The community has no official status, but is nonetheless recognized in names of Greenburgh facilities such as "East Irvington Park" and the "East Irvington Nature Preserve", as well as in the East Irvington School, formerly a facility of the Irvington School District and now converted to condominiums. (The school was listed on the National Register of Historic Places in 1983.) East Irvington was formerly known as "Dublin" from the population of Irish immigrant laborers there who worked on the large estates in the area, on the railroads and docks, or in the stone quarries, the remnants of which still exist.

References

External links

Town of Greenburgh official website
Tocqueville in Greenburgh - Segment from C-SPAN's Alexis de Tocqueville Tour

 
Towns in Westchester County, New York
New York (state) populated places on the Hudson River
1788 establishments in New York (state)
Populated places established in 1788